A Familienbuch ("Family-book") was a family register, a genealogical summary that was issued in Germany by the local civil registry upon marriage and contained data on birth, marriage and death of the couple as well as the birth data of any children stemming for this marriage.

It was introduced from January 1, 1938, same kind like books for birth and death. However, the Familienstammbuch dates to much earlier. At least to 1920 in Breslau, Germany, for example.

From January 1, 1958, it was modified: Marriage entry was done by the local civil registry, but the "book" itself which was a paper then was moved to the local civil registry when the family did a removal.

Since January 1, 2009, Familienbücher have no longer been issued.

Family registers
Marriage
Identity documents of Germany